Youssef Boughanem (born December 6, 1989) is a Moroccan-Belgian Muay Thai and kickboxer, who has held WKN super welterweight Muay Thai title. He is also a former Lumpinee Stadium, Rajadamnern Stadium and WBC Muay Thai World Middleweight Champion. Boughanem currently trains out of the Petchsaman Gym in Thailand.

Boughanem is also a former Thai Fight tournament winner, having competed for the promotion from 2010 to 2017.

Muay Thai career
Youssef began practicing Muay Thai at the age of 12 and moved to Thailand with his brother, Yassine Boughanem, at the age of 17 to focus on training on a fulltime basis after the loss of both his parents. Yassine is a Muay Thai fighter in the heavyweight and super heavyweight divisions.

2010
He gained prominence when he competed in the first-ever Thai Fight event in 2010. On August 29, 2010, he defeated Australia's Jason Lea in the round-of-sixteen. He then defeated Ireland's Anthony Kane via extra-round decision in the quarter-finals on October 25, 2010. On December 6, 2010, Boughanem defeated Soichiro Miyakoshi to advance to the final round of the Thai Fight tournament. That same night, he lost to Fabio Pinca in the final, where he finished as the runner-up in the 2010 Thai Fight 67 kg Tournament.

2012
On 3 March 2012, Boughanem faced Rajadamnern Stadium champion Diesellek TopkingBoxing and got knocked out with a left kick at Lumpini Stadium.

2013

THAI FIGHT Kard Chuek
After his first Thai Fight outing, Boughanem fought for different programs around Thailand and France. He eventually returned in 2013 when Thai Fight unveiled their new format: THAI FIGHT Kard Chuek. This format saw fighters wearing rope bindings instead of gloves (Muay Kard Chuek) and would eventually become the defining characteristic for subsequent Thai Fight events. Youssef Boughanem would enter the inaugural THAI FIGHT Kard Chuek tournament. On June 1, 2013, he defeated Salahdine Ait Naceur by second-round knockout in the 1/16 finals. He then beat Sebastien Billard in the 1/8 finals by first-round knockout on June 15, 2013.

On July 14, 2013, Boughanem faced Burmese fighter Zaw Tum in the quarterfinals and won by decision. Zaw Tum is better known as Tun Tun Min and went on to become Openweight Lethwei World Champion.

On July 29, 2013, Boughanem was eliminated from the tournament when he lost in the semifinal round by decision to Saiyok Pumpanmuang, who eventually finished as the THAI FIGHT Kard Chuek tournament runner-up.

2015

2015 THAI FIGHT Champion
After an absence from the promotion in 2014, Youssef Boughanem made his return to Thai Fight in late 2015, appearing at THAI FIGHT Vietnam on October 24, 2015. There, he faced Russian fighter Yurik Davtyan and won by decision. Later on, he entered the 2015 THAI FIGHT 72.5 kg tournament. In the tournament semifinals, Boughanem defeated Rungrawee P.K. Saenchaimuaythaigym at THAI FIGHT RPCA on November 21, 2015. On December 31, 2015, he defeated Sudsakorn Sor Klinmee at THAI FIGHT Count Down to win the 2015 THAI FIGHT 72.5 kg tournament and capture his first Thai Fight title.

Omnoi Stadium Middleweight Champion
On August 15, 2015, Youssef Boughanem defeated Rungrawee P.K. Saenchaimuaythaigym by third-round knockout to capture the Omnoi Stadium middleweight title. He successfully defended the Omnoi Stadium title against Chanajon P.K. Saenchai Muaythaigym by five-round decision on September 26 of the same year.

2016
On June 24, 2016, Youssef Boughanem defeated Armen Petrosyan via three-decision in Monte Carlo to win the WAKO Pro 71.8 kg Championship.

Rajadamnern Stadium Middleweight Champion
On August 31, 2016, he defeated Kompetch Lookprabat by fourth-round knockout to capture the Rajadamnern Stadium middleweight championship.

2018

WBC Muay Thai World Middleweight Champion
On February 26, 2018, Boughanem retained the Rajadamnern title against Noppakaw Siriluck Muaythai by third-round knockout at Phoenix 5 Bangkok, which also saw him winning the WBC Muay Thai Middleweight World Championship.

On April 28, 2018, he defeated Payakdam Extra Cole Film by third-round TKO to win the IBF Muaythai middleweight title.

Lumpinee Stadium Middleweight Champion
On May 22, 2018, Youssef Boughanem defeated Talaytong Sor. Thanaphet by fourth-round TKO to win the Lumpinee Stadium middleweight championship.

He retained the WBC Muay Thai title against Kongjak Por. Pao In on October 13, 2018, where he also won the ISKA Muay Thai light middleweight title.

He defended the WBC Muay Thai title a third time against Joe Craven on April 22, 2019, winning by fourth-round TKO. Boughanem successfully retained the WBC Muay Thai belt in his fourth title defense against Tobias Alexandersson on November 16, 2019, winning a five-round decision.

Boughanem was originally scheduled to defend his WBC Muay Thai belt against Liam Nolan on July 17 at PSM Fight Night. However, travel restrictions between the UK and Belgium prevented Nolan from making the fight. Nolan would be replaced by Niclas Larsen. On July 17, 2021, Youssef Boughanem defeated Niclas Larsen to retain the WBC Muay Thai middleweight title, as well as capture the WBC Muay Thai Diamond middleweight championship.

Boughanem was scheduled to defend his WBC Muaythai Middleweight title against Liam Nolan at A Night to Remember on November 7, 2021. He lost the fight and the title by split decision, ending his three-year reign as WBC world champion.

Boughanem was booked to face David Pennimpede on March 26, 2022.

WKN World Super Welterweight Muay Thai champion
On April 22, 2019 in Brussels, Belgium Boughanem defeated Joe Craven by TKO in the fourth round and became the WKN World super welterweight champion in Muay Thai.

On June 25, 2022 in Liege, Belgium Boughanem made the first successful defense of his WKN World super welterweight title by knockout in the third round against Toni Romero at La Nuit Des Gladiateurs 2022.

Titles and accomplishments
 World Muaythai Council 
 2022 WMC Golden King World 164 lb Champion 
 WBC Muay Thai
 2021 WBC Muay Thai Diamond Middleweight Champion  
 2019 WBC Muay Thai Middleweight Champion (one time, four defenses)  
 World Kickboxing Network
 2019 WKN Muay Thai World Super Welterweight Champion (1 Defense)
 International Sport Karate Association 
 2018 ISKA Muay Thai Light Middleweight Champion
 Lumpinee Stadium
 2018 Lumpinee Stadium Middleweight 160 lb Champion
 IBF Muaythai
 2018 IBF Muaythai Middleweight Champion
 Phoenix Fighting Championship
 2017 Phoenix FC Middleweight Champion
 Rajadamnern Stadium
 2016 Rajadamnern Stadium Middleweight 160 lb Champion
 World Association of Kickboxing Organizations 
 2016 WAKO Pro Kickboxing 71.8 kg/158 lbs Champion
 Thai Fight
 2015 Thai Fight 72.5 kg Tournament Champion 
 2010 Thai Fight 67 kg Tournament Runner Up 
 18–2 record
 Omnoi Stadium 
 2015 Omnoi Stadium Middleweight 160 lb Champion
 Venum Victory World Series
 2015 Venum Middleweight Champion
 MAX Muay Thai
 2014 MAX Muay Thai Tournament Champion
 World Muaythai Association
 2010 WMA 71 kg Tournament Champion
 1-KING
 2010 1-KING Tournament Champion
 The Champions Club
 2010 TCC Super Welterweight Tournament Champion
 Thepprasit Stadium
 2009 Thepprasit Stadium Champion
 Belgian Muaythai Organisation 
 2007 Belgium Muay Thai Champion

Muay Thai record

|- style="background:#cfc;"
| 2023-02-02|| Win ||align=left| Federico Puddu || PSM Fight Night || Goussainville, France || KO (Knee to body)|| 3 || 
|-
|- style="background:#cfc;"
| 2023-01-02|| Win ||align=left| Sudsakorn Sor Klinmee || Golden King Promotions || Koh Samui, Thailand || KO (Knee to body)|| 4 || 
|-
! style=background:white colspan=9 |
|- style="background:#cfc;"
| 2022-11-12|| Win ||align=left| Tobias Alexandersson || Alpha Fight League 2 || Brussels, Belgium || TKO (Doctor stoppage)|| 2 || 
|-
! style=background:white colspan=9 |
|- style="background:#cfc"
| 2022-06-25 || Win || align=left| Toni Romero || La Nuit Des Gladiateurs 2022 || Liege, Belgium || TKO || 3 ||
|-
! style=background:white colspan=9 |
|-
|- style="background:#cfc"
| 2022-05-28 || Win ||align=left| Avatar Tor.Morsri || Fairtex Fight, Lumpinee Stadium|| Bangkok, Thailand || Decision || 3 ||3:00
|- style="background:#cfc"
| 2022-03-26|| Win ||align=left| David Pennimpede || Infliction Fight Series || Australia || Decision (Split)|| 3 ||3:00 
|-
|- style="background:#cfc;"
| 2022-01-29|| Win ||align=left| Sangchan SorSor.Nawat || RAGE FIGHT NIGHT || Pattaya, Thailand || Decision  || 3 || 3:00 
|- style="background:#fbb;"
|  2021-11-07 || Loss || align="left" | Liam Nolan || Real Fighters || Hilversum, Netherlands || Decision (Split) || 5 || 3:00
|-
! style=background:white colspan=9 |
|- style="background:#cfc;"
| 2021-07-17|| Win ||align=left| Niclas Larsen || PSM Fight Night || Brussels, Belgium || Decision (Unanimous) || 5 || 3:00 
|-
! style=background:white colspan=9 |
|- style="background:#cfc;"
| 2020-01-29|| Win ||align=left| Ignasi Larios || Prestige Fight || Paris, France || KO || 3 ||
|- style="background:#cfc;"
| 2019-11-16|| Win ||align=left| Tobias Alexandersson || PSM Fight Night || Brussels, Belgium || Decision || 5 || 3:00
|-
! style=background:white colspan=9 |
|- style="background:#fbb;"
| 2019-02-23|| Loss||align=left| Wilson Varela || Arena Fight || Aix-en-Provence, France || Decision || 5 || 3:00 
|-
! style=background:white colspan=9 |
|- style="background:#cfc;"
| 2018-11-24|| Win ||align=left| Joe Craven || PSM Fight Night || Brussels, Belgium || TKO || 4 || 
|-
! style=background:white colspan=9 |
|- style="background:#cfc;"
| 2018-11-24|| Win ||align=left| Jake Purdy || Yas Island Muay Thai Championship 2018 || Abu Dhabi, United Arab Emirates || KO || 2 ||
|- style="background:#cfc;"
| 2018-10-13|| Win ||align=left| Kongjak Por Pao In || Phoenix 10 || Brussels, Belgium || Decision || 5 || 3:00 
|-
! style=background:white colspan=9 |
|- style="background:#cfc;"
| 2018-05-22|| Win ||align=left| Talaytong Sor.Thanaphet || Lumpinee Stadium || Bangkok, Thailand || TKO || 4 || 
|-
! style=background:white colspan=9 |
|- style="background:#cfc;"
| 2018-04-28|| Win ||align=left| Payakdam Extra Cole Film || Phoenix 7 Phuket || Phuket, Thailand || TKO || 3 ||
|-
! style=background:white colspan=9 |
|- style="background:#cfc;"
| 2018-02-26|| Win ||align=left| Noppakaw Siriluck Muay Thai || Phoenix 5 Bangkok || Bangkok, Thailand || KO || 3 || 
|-
! style=background:white colspan=9 |
|- style="background:#cfc;"
| 2017-09-22|| Win ||align=left| Artur Saladiak || Phoenix 3 London || London, United Kingdom || TKO || 3 ||
|- 
! style=background:white colspan=9 |
|- style="background:#cfc;"
| 2017-08-07|| Win ||align=left| Yodpayak Sitsongpeenong || Rajadamnern Stadium || Bangkok, Thailand || KO || 5 || 3:00
|- style="background:#cfc;"
| 2017-07-15|| Win ||align=left| Saber Athari || THAI FIGHT We Love Yala || Yala, Thailand || KO || 1 ||
|- style="background:#cfc;"
| 2017-06-29|| Win ||align=left| Wanchalerm Uddonmuang || Best of Siam XI || Paris, France || TKO (Retirement) || 4 ||
|- style="background:#cfc;"
| 2017-05-27|| Win ||align=left| Anouar Khamlali || THAI FIGHT Turin || Turin, Italy || Decision || 3 || 3:00
|- style="background:#cfc;"
| 2017-07-15|| Win ||align=left| Ilyass Chakir || THAI FIGHT Samui 2017 || Ko Samui, Thailand || Decision || 3 || 3:00
|- style="background:#cfc;"
| 2017-04-08|| Win ||align=left| Gaëtan Dambo || THAI FIGHT Paris || Paris, France || Decision || 3 || 3:00
|- style="background:#cfc;"
| 2017-10-15 || Win ||align=left| Ahmed Aushev || THAI FIGHT Chengdu || Leshan, China || KO|| 1 ||
|-  style="background:#cfc;"
| 2016-12-24 || Win ||align=left| Saiyok Pumpanmuang || THAI FIGHT The Fighter King || Bangkok, Thailand || Decision || 3 || 3:00
|-  style="background:#cfc;"
| 2016-08-31 || Win ||align=left| Kompetchlek Lookprabat || Rajadamnern Stadium || Bangkok, Thailand || KO || 4 || 
|-
! style=background:white colspan=9 |
|- style="background:#cfc;"
| 2016-06-24 || Win ||align=left| Armen Petrosyan || Monte-Carlo Fighting Masters || Monte Carlo, Monaco || Decision || 3 || 3:00 
|-
! style=background:white colspan=9|
|- style="background:#c5d2ea;"
| 2016-05-27 || NC ||align=left| Kompetchlek Lookprabat || Best of Siam || Bangkok, Thailand || No Contest || 1 || 
|-
! style=background:white colspan=9|
|- style="background:#cfc;"
| 2016-03-19 || Win ||align=left| Denphanom Rongreankeela Korat || THAI FIGHT Korat || Nakhon Ratchasima, Thailand || Decision || 3 || 3:00
|- style="background:#cfc;"
| 2015-03-12|| Win ||align=left| Matheus Pereira || THAI FIGHT || Bangkok, Thailand || KO || 3 ||
|-  style="background:#cfc;"
| 2015-12-31|| Win ||align=left| Sudsakorn Sor Klinmee || THAI FIGHT Count Down || Bangkok, Thailand || Decision || 3 || 3:00
|-
! style=background:white colspan=9|
|-  style="background:#cfc;"
| 2015-11-21|| Win ||align=left| Rungrawee P.K. Saenchaimuaythaigym || THAI FIGHT RPCA || Nakhon Pathom, Thailand || Decision || 3 || 3:00
|-  style="background:#cfc;"
| 2015-10-24|| Win ||align=left| Yurik Davtyan || THAI FIGHT Vietnam || Ho Chi Minh City, Vietnam || Decision || 3 || 3:00
|- style="background:#cfc;"
| 2015-09-26|| Win ||align=left| Chanajon P.K. Saenchai Muaythaigym || Omnoi Stadium || Bangkok, Thailand || Decision || 5 || 3:00
|-
! style=background:white colspan=9 |
|-  style="background:#cfc;"
| 2015-08-15 || Win ||align=left| Rungrawee P.K. Saenchaimuaythaigym || Omnoi Stadium || Bangkok, Thailand || KO || 3 ||
|-
! style=background:white colspan=9 |
|-  style="background:#cfc;"
| 2015-03-07 || Win ||align=left| Chenrob Pumpanmuang || Master of the Ring || Pattaya, Thailand || Decision || 5 || 3:00
|-
! style=background:white colspan=9 |
|-  style="background:#fbb;"
| 2015-02-01 || Loss ||align=left| Kanongsuk Chuwattana || MAX Muay Thai, Tournament Semi-Finals || Bangkok, Thailand || Disqualification || 2 ||
|-  style="background:#cfc;"
| 2014-11-09 || Win ||align=left| Tobias Alexandersson || MAX Muay Thai, Tournament Qualification Finals || Pattaya, Thailand || Decision || 3 || 3:00
|-  style="background:#cfc;"
| 2014-11-09 || Win ||align=left| Fahmongkol Sor. Jor. Danrayong || MAX Muay Thai, Tournament Qualification Semi-Finals || Pattaya, Thailand || Decision || 4 || 3:00
|-  style="background:#cfc;"
| 2014-10-05 || Win ||align=left| Kanongsuk Chuwattana || MAX Muay Thai|| Pattaya, Thailand || KO || 2 ||
|-  style="background:#cfc;"
| 2014-09-28 || Win ||align=left| Sun Weiqiang || Wu Lin Feng || Hong Kong || Decision || 3 || 3:00
|-  style="background:#fbb;"
| 2014-06-14 || Loss ||align=left| Thongchai Sitsongpeenong || Best of Siam 5 || Paris, France || TKO (Injury) || 3 ||
|- style="background:#cfc;"
| 2014-04-12 || Win ||align=left| Chenrob Pumpanmuang || Thepprasit Stadium || Pattaya, Thailand || TKO || 4 ||
|- style="background:#fbb;"
| 2014-03-29 || Loss ||align=left| Aikpracha Meenayothin || MAX Muay Thai|| Bangkok, Thailand || Decision || 3 || 3:00
|-  style="background:#cfc;"
| 2014-02-17 || Win ||align=left| Chenrob Pumpanmuang || Thepprasit Stadium || Pattaya, Thailand || KO ||  ||
|-  style="background:#fbb;"
| 2013-07-29 || Loss ||align=left| Saiyok Pumpanmuang || THAI FIGHT Kard Chuek, Semi-finals || Bangkok, Thailand || Decision || 3 || 3:00
|-  style="background:#cfc;"
| 2013-07-14 || Win ||align=left| Tun Tun Min || THAI FIGHT Kard Chuek, Quarter-finals || Bangkok, Thailand || Decision || 3 || 3:00
|-  style="background:#cfc;"
| 2013-06-29 || Win ||align=left| Peemai Jitmuangnon || THAI FIGHT || Bangkok, Thailand || Decision || 3 || 3:00
|-  style="background:#cfc;"
| 2013-06-15 || Win ||align=left| Sebastien Billard || THAI FIGHT Kard Chuek, 1/8 finals || Bangkok, Thailand || KO || 1 ||
|-  style="background:#cfc;"
| 2013-06-01 || Win ||align=left| Salahdine Ait Naceur || THAI FIGHT Kard Chuek, 1/16 finals || Bangkok, Thailand || KO || 2 ||
|-  style="background:#fbb;"
| 2012-06-14 || Loss ||align=left| Aikpracha Meenayothin || Best of Siam || Paris, France || TKO (Injury) || 2 ||
|-  style="background:#fbb;"
| 2012-03-24 || Loss ||align=left| Diesellek TopkingBoxing || Muaydee Vitheethai || Samut Prakan, Thailand || KO || 2 ||
|-  style="background:#fbb;"
| 2012-02-27 || Loss ||align=left| Suriya Prasathinphimai || Europe vs. Thailand || Pattaya, France || Decision || 5 || 3:00
|-  style="background:#c5d2ea;"
| 2012-01-07 || Draw ||align=left| Dernchonlek Sor. Sor. Niyom || Omnoi Stadium || Bangkok, Thailand || Decision || 5 || 3:00
|-  style="background:#fbb;"
| 2011-12-10 || Loss ||align=left| Thepsutin Pumpanmuang || Thepprasit Stadium || Pattaya, Thailand || Decision || 5 || 3:00
|-  style="background:#fbb;"
| 2011-02-12 || Loss ||align=left| Buakaw Banchamek || La Nuit des Titans: Buakaw vs. Boughanem || Tours, France || TKO (Injury) || 1 ||
|-  style="background:#fbb;"
| 2010-12-06 || Loss ||align=left| Fabio Pinca || THAI FIGHT Final, Finals || Nakhon Ratchasima, Thailand || Decision || 3 || 3:00 
|-
! style=background:white colspan=9 |
|-  style="background:#cfc;"
| 2010-12-06 || Win ||align=left| Soichiro Miyakoshi || THAI FIGHT Final, Semi-finals || Nakhon Ratchasima, Thailand || Decision || 3 || 3:00
|-  style="background:#cfc;"
| 2010-10-25 || Win ||align=left| Anthony Kane || THAI FIGHT, Quarter-finals || Bangkok, Thailand || Decision || 4 || 3:00
|-  style="background:#cfc;"
| 2010-08-29 || Win ||align=left| Jason Lea || THAI FIGHT, 1/8 finals || Bangkok, Thailand || Decision || 3 || 3:00
|-  style="background:#cfc;"
| 2010-07-12 || Win ||align=left| Big Ben Chor Praram 6  || Thepprasit Stadium || Pattaya, Thailand || Decision || 5 || 3:00
|-  style="background:#cfc;"
| 2010-05-22 || Win ||align=left| Behzad Rafigh Doust || WMA Tournament, Finals || Zhengzhou, China || Decision || 3 || 3:00 
|- 
! style=background:white colspan=9 |
|-  style="background:#cfc;"
| 2010-05-22 || Win ||align=left| Egon Racz || WMA Tournament, Semi-finals || Zhengzhou, China || Decision || 3 || 3:00
|-  style="background:#cfc;"
| 2010-05-22 || Win ||align=left| Alain Sylvestre || WMA Tournament, Quarter-finals || Zhengzhou, China || KO || 1 ||
|-  style="background:#cfc;"
| 2010-01-31 || Win ||align=left| Thepsutin Pumpanmuang || Channel 7 Boxing Stadium || Bangkok, Thailand || TKO (Injury) || 5 ||
|-  style="background:#cfc;"
| 2010-01-07 || Win ||align=left| Stephen Meikle || The Champions Club Thailand, Finals || Pattaya, Thailand || KO || 1 ||    
|- 
! style=background:white colspan=9 |
|-  style="background:#cfc;"
| 2010-01-07 || Win ||align=left| Jason Woodham || The Champions Club Thailand, Semi-finals || Pattaya, Thailand || TKO || 1 ||
|-  style="background:#cfc;"
| 2009-12-22 || Win ||align=left| Pornpitak Petchudomchai || Chaweng Boxing Stadium || Ko Samui, Thailand || TKO || 2 ||
|-  style="background:#cfc;"
| 2009-12-22 || Win ||align=left| Pornpitak Petchudomchai || Chaweng Boxing Stadium || Ko Samui, Thailand || TKO || 2 ||
|-  style="background:#cfc;"
| 2009-12-08 || Win ||align=left| Tawalitnoi SKV Gym || Surat Thani Fight Night|| Surat Thani, Thailand || Decision || 5 || 3:00
|-  style="background:#cfc;"
| 2009-12-04 || Win ||align=left| Petmai Petjaopraya || King's Birthday || Bangkok, Thailand || TKO || 4 ||
|-  style="background:#fbb;"
| 2009-11-27 || Loss ||align=left| Prakaisaeng Sit-Or || Toyota Vigo Cup, Finals || Bangkok, Thailand || Decision || 5 || 3:00
|-  style="background:#cfc;"
| 2009-11-27 || Win ||align=left| Longern Pitakkruchaidaen || Toyota Vigo Cup, Semi-finals || Bangkok, Thailand || Decision || 5 || 3:00
|-  style="background:#cfc;"
| 2009-11-27 || Win ||align=left| Sofian Seboussi || Toyota Vigo Cup, Quarter-finals || Bangkok, Thailand || Decision || 5 || 3:00
|-  style="background:#cfc;"
| 2009-10-28 || Win ||align=left| Chokchai Sor Kingstar || Rajadamnern Stadium || Bangkok, Thailand || Decision || 5 || 3:00
|-  style="background:#cfc;"
| 2009-10-28 || Win ||align=left| Steve Sasiprapa || Queen's Birthday || Bangkok, Thailand || KO || 3 ||
|-  style="background:#cfc;"
| 2009-07-23 || Win ||align=left| Mangkornyok Sityodtong || Thepprasit Stadium || Pattaya, Thailand || TKO ||  ||
|-  style="background:#cfc;"
| 2009-07-15 || Win ||align=left| Numbeechai Nakatornparkview || Surat Thani Fight Night || Surat Thani, Thailand || Decision || 5 || 3:00
|-  style="background:#cfc;"
| 2009-07-04 || Win ||align=left| Yodnapa Changtalay || Bangla Stadium || Phuket, Thailand || KO || 3 ||
|-  style="background:#cfc;"
| 2009-06-30 || Win ||align=left| Mankong Sitpaneng ||  || Phuket, Thailand || Decision || 5 || 3:00
|-  style="background:#cfc;"
| 2009-06-24 || Win ||align=left| Pet-tho Baan Muaythai || Surat Thani Fight Night || Surat Thani, Thailand || KO || 4 ||
|-  style="background:#cfc;"
| 2008-08-01 || Win ||align=left| Robin van Roosmalen ||  || Veghel, Netherlands ||  ||  ||
|-
| colspan=9 | Legend:

References

External links
 Fight record at Muay Thai TV

1989 births
Living people
Sportspeople from Brussels
Belgian sportspeople of Moroccan descent
Belgian Muay Thai practitioners
Moroccan Muay Thai practitioners
Belgian male kickboxers
Moroccan male kickboxers
Middleweight kickboxers
Welterweight kickboxers